Tonyukuk (born c. 646, died c. 726) was the baga-tarkhan (supreme commander) and adviser of four successive Göktürk khagans – Ilterish Qaghan, Qapaghan Qaghan, Inel Qaghan and Bilge Qaghan. He conducted victorious campaigns against various Turkic and non-Turkic steppe peoples, such as Tölis, Xueyantuo, Toquz Oguz, Yenisei Kyrgyz, Kurykans, Thirty Tatar, Khitan and Tatabi as well as the Tang dynasty. He was described as a kingmaker by historians such as E. P. Thompson and Peter Benjamin Golden.

Name 
The name is spelled as t1-o-ɲ-uq1-uq1 in the Old Turkic script, variously interpreted as Tunuquq, Tonuquq, Tuj-uquq,  Toɲ Yuguq, Tujun-oq, Tojuquq, Tuɲoqoq with a number of suggestions for its etymology. According to Sertkaya, Tunuk means "clear, pure, abyss, who reached the depth" or "pure, penetrative", and uq or oq means "idea, wise, well-informed". Thus, Tonuquq is the owner of deep and pure idea. His title "Bilge" means wise or master. According to Klyashtorny, the element yuquq means "hidden, protected thing, value, treasure, jewelry", which is derived from the verb "yoq/yuq" meaning "to hide, to protect" (used in Uyghur legal documents); meanwhile, the other ton means "first"; thus his Chinese name 元珍 Yuánzhēn is a calque of his Turkic name Tonyuquq, both meaning "first treasure" René M. Giraud read the name as tonïuquq, from ton "dress, clothes" with I possessive and yuquq (from the verb yuk- "to stick") and meaning "whose dress is blessed with oil"; Likewise, Jean-Paul Roux explained the name as "with oiled dress" while discussing the culinary culture of the Mongols and suggesting that they had dirty and stained clothes.

Life

Early years 

He was born around 646, near Tuul River in Ashide tribe. He fled the Tang dynasty in 679 and joined Elteriš in 681.

Chinese sources state that Tonyuquq's name was Yuanzhen, and he learned all Chinese traditions and was aware of the gaps in the borders and the Chinese wall. While he was supervising the surrendered clans in Chanyü military governorship, he was dismissed and jailed by the military governor Changshih.

During Elteriš's reign 
Although he lost early wars against Xue Rengui, he was formidable force in establishing Turkic Khaganate. In 687, another invasion of Tang by Elteriš and Ashide Yuanzhen began.  Empress Dowager Wu commissioned the ethnically Baekje general Heichi Changzhi, assisted by Li Duozuo, to defend against Turkic attack and they were able to defeat Turk forces at Huanghuadui (modern day Shuozhou, Shanxi) causing Turk forces to flee.

During Qapγan's reign 

In 703, he was sent by qaγan for marriage proposal to the Wu Zhou dynasty. Wu Zetian accepted the proposal, in exchange Wu Yanxiu was released on khagan's order. However, Emperor Zhongzhong's accession changed political climate. Marriage was cancelled.

In 712, he commanded Tujue army during Battle of Bolchu which proved disastrous for Turgesh army.

During Inäl's reign 
He was not in active politics during Inäl's reign and accepted him as a legitimate ruler. Although this did not cost him his life and was spared, perhaps because of his great authority and his age. Another reason would the fact that he was Bilge Qaghan's father-in-law.

During Bilgä's reign 
In 716 he was appointed to be Master Strategist (Bagha Tarkhan) by his son-in-law Bilgä Qaγan.

Chinese sources state that Bilgä Qaγan wanted to convert to Buddhism, establish cities and temples. However, Tonyukuk discouraged him from this by pointing out that their nomadic lifestyle was what made them a greater military power when compared to Tang dynasty. While Turks' power rested on their mobility, conversion to Buddhism would bring pacifism among population. Therefore sticking to Tengriism was necessary to survive.

In 720 Tang chancellor Wang Jun proposed a plan to attack Bilgä Qaγan along with the Baximi, Xi, and Khitan. Emperor Xuanzong also recruited Qapγan Qaγan's sons Bilgä Tegin and Mo Tegin, Yenisei Kyrgyz Qaγan Qutluğ Bilgä Qaγan and Huoba Guiren to fight against Tujue. Tonyukuk cunningly launched first attack on Baximi in 721 autumn, completely crushing them. Meanwhile Bilgä raided Gansu, taking much of the livestock. Later that year Khitans, next year Xi were also crushed.

He died around 726.

Family 
He was father to Eletmiš Bilgä Qatun and a father-in-law to Bilgä Qaγan, thus a grandfather to Yollïg and Teŋrï Qaγans.

Legacy 
His biography, achievements and advice for state administration were carved in the so-called Orkhon-Turkic script on two stele erected around 716 (before his death) at a site known as Bayn Tsokto, in Ulaanbataar's Nalaikh district. Yuan era Uyghur official Xie Wenzhi (楔文質), as well as Korean Gyeongju Seol clan claimed descent from Tonyukuk.

He was mentioned and remembered in some Uyghur Manichaean texts later in Qocho.

The Berlin Manichaean manuscript found in Qocho read as follows:

In popular culture
 Portrayed by Kim Seong-hun in the 2006-2007 KBS TV series Dae Jo Yeong.

References 

E. Denison Ross, The Tonyukuk Inscription, Being a Translation of Professor Vilhelm Thomsen's final Danish Rendering, Bulletin of the School of Oriental Studies, University of London, 1930.
 Nathan Light. An 8th Century Turkic Narrative: Pragmatics, Reported Speech and Managing Information. Turkic languages. 10.2, 2006. pp 155–186.

External links
Tonyukuk Inscriptions complete text
Tonyukuk’s Memorial Complex, Language Committee of Ministry of Culture and Information of the Republic of Kazakhstan

8th-century deaths
Year of birth unknown
7th-century Turkic people
8th-century Turkic people
Ashide
646 births
726 deaths
People from Hohhot